My Precious You is a 2008 South Korean television series. It aired on KBS2 on Saturdays to Sundays at 19:55 for 54 episodes beginning October 4, 2008.

Cast

Main
Hong Ah-reum as Kim Bo-ri
Kim Sung-soo as Lee In-ho / Jun Sul
Lee Tae-ran as Jang In-ho
Ji Hyun-woo as Jang Shin-ho
Park Joon-mok as young Shin-ho
Song Joong-ki as Jang Jin-ho
Yoo In-young as Baek Se-ra
Hong Soo-ah as Baek Jae-ra
Choi Jin-hyuk as Ha Dong-woo / Alex

Supporting cast
Shin Ki-joon as Lee Eun-oo
Kim Soo-jung as Lee Ji-oo
Park Joo-ah as Jeon Seol's grandmother
Park In-hwan as Jang Il-nam (In Ho, Shin-ho & Jin-ho's father)
Park Joon-gyu as Baek Joon-shik (Jae-ra & Se-ra's father)
Park Hae-mi as Nam Joo-ri (Jae-ra & Se-ra's mother)

Other people
Na Moon-hee as Song In-soon (Il-nam's ex-wife)
Choi Su-rin as Seo Young-joo (In-ho's ex-wife)
Kim San-ho as Kang Min (Young-joo's boyfriend)
Yoon Hae-young as Park Jem-ma (radio show producer)
Choi Ah-jin as Mi-ri (radio show gopher)
Choi Yoon-so as Han Yoo-jin
Choi Seung-kyung as Chef Jung-geum
Kwon Ki-sun as In-ho's aunt
Jang Yoo-joon as new singer Kim Ji-won
Song Jong-ho as (In-ho's blind date)
Kim Woo-suk as Eun Woo
Shinee (cameo, ep 9–10)
Oh Ji-ho as himself (cameo, eps 7, 9, 10)
Tae Jin-ah as himself (cameo, ep 1)
Heo Soo-kyung as herself (cameo, ep 1)
Oh Min-suk as Jae-ra's teacher
Song Seung-yong

Notes

References

External links
 

2008 South Korean television series debuts
2009 South Korean television series endings
Korean-language television shows
Korean Broadcasting System television dramas
Television series by RaemongRaein